The skimmers, forming the genus Rynchops, are tern-like birds in the family Laridae. The genus comprises three species found in South Asia, Africa, and the Americas. They were formerly known as the scissorbills.

The three species are the only birds with distinctive uneven bills, where the lower mandible is longer than the upper. This remarkable adaptation allows them to fish in a unique way, flying low and fast over streams. Their lower mandible skims or slices over the water's surface, ready to snap shut any small fish unable to dart clear. The skimmers are sometimes included within the gull family Laridae but separated in other treatments which consider them as a sister group of the terns. The black skimmer has an additional adaptation and is the only species of bird known to have slit-shaped pupils. Their bills fall within their field of binocular vision, which enables them to carefully position their bill and capture prey. They are agile in flight and gather in large flocks along rivers and coastal sand banks.

They are tropical and subtropical species which lay 3–6 eggs on sandy beaches. The female incubates the eggs. Because of the species' restricted nesting habitat the three species are vulnerable to disturbance at their nesting sites. One species, the Indian skimmer, is considered vulnerable by the IUCN due to this as well as destruction and degradation of the lakes and rivers it uses for feeding.

However, the misspelling rynchops was the one first published by Linnaeus and continues to be more commonly used. Similarly, the gender of the Greek and Roman words is feminine and the genus was originally treated as such (R. nigra) but Rynchops is now usually treated as a masculine noun (R. niger).

Taxonomy
The genus Rynchops was introduced in 1758 by the Swedish naturalist Carl Linnaeus in the tenth edition of his Systema Naturae. The genus name Rynchops is from the Ancient Greek ῥυγχος/rhunkhos meaning "bill" and κοπτω/koptō meaning "to cut off". The type species is the black skimmer (Rynchops niger).

Species
The genus contains three species.

Notes

References

External links

Skimmer videos on the Internet Bird Collection

 
Taxa named by Carl Linnaeus